Tone Rønoldtangen (born 5 August 1953) is a Norwegian trade unionist and politician for the Labour Party.

She was born in Nes, Akershus where she has chaired the local Labour Party and served as an elected municipal council member.

She started her career at sea, working in a galley. She later worked as a radio officer after completing the two-year training. She moved home to Opakermoen when she was hired as an accountant for the Royal Norwegian Air Force, working out of Kongsvinger. She later became a full-time trade unionist in the Norwegian Civil Service Union, and was elected as treasurer here in 2006. In 2010 she advanced to the first female leader of LO Stat, where she had been a board member since 1998.

References

 

1953 births
Living people
People from Nes, Akershus
Norwegian trade unionists
Labour Party (Norway) politicians
Akershus politicians
Norwegian sailors